Herbert Edmund Carter (September 25, 1910 – March 4, 2007) was an American biochemist and educator. He grew up in central Indiana and received his bachelor's degree from DePauw University. He received a Ph.D. in 1934 in organic chemistry from the University of Illinois. Was elected to the National Academy of Sciences and the American Academy of Arts and Sciences.

Career
He remained at Illinois as a member of the faculty and served as head of the Department of Chemistry and Chemical Engineering (1954–1967) and later as Vice Chancellor for Academic Affairs (1968–1971). It was at the University of Illinois that Carter in collaboration with William C. Rose, determined the structure of threonine.

Following his retirement from Illinois in 1971, he moved to the University of Arizona and established the very successful Office of Interdisciplinary Programs. He recognized that the processes and systems underlying individual disciplines are remarkably similar and interdependent, and concluded that what lies in between disciplines—the area of interdisciplinarity—is where future developments, discoveries, and training programs would flourish. The Herbert E. Carter Travel Award is named in his honor. He created and headed the University Department of Biochemistry (1977–1980). He remained active at the University of Arizona until the age of 94.

Carter was also active in the scientific community. He played important roles as President of the American Society of Biological Chemists (1956–1957) and as member (1954) and chair of many important committees of the United States National Academy of Sciences, the National Research Council, the Gordon Research Conferences, the National Institutes of Health, and the National Science Foundation. He served as a member, and then as chairman, of the National Science Board. In recognition of his contributions at the National Science Board, a mountain ridge in Antarctica, Carter Ridge, was named after him. He was the founder of the series Biochemical Preparations, and served as a member of the editorial boards of many scientific journals, including the Journal of Biological Chemistry and the Journal of Lipid Research.

Awards and honors

 1970 - Received the Alton E. Bailey Award from the North Central Section of the American Oil Chemists' Society
 1961 - Became a John Simon Guggenheim Memorial Foundation Fellow
 1952 - Received an Honorary Degree from DePauw University
 1953 - Joined the United States National Academy of Sciences
 1943 - Received the Eli Lilly Award in Biological Chemistry for his identification of the structure and synthesis of sphingosine.

Selected publications
 Carter, H. E., and C. B. Hirschberg. 1968. Phytosphingosines and branched sphingosines in kidney. Biochemistry. 7: 2296–2300.
 Carter, H. E., R. C. Gaver, and R. K. Yu. 1966. A novel branched-chain sphingolipid base from Crithidia facsiculata. Biochem. Biophys. Res. Commun. 22: 316–320.
 Carter, H. E., and Y. Fujino. 1956. Biochemistry of the sphingolipides. IX. Configuration of cerebrosides. J. Biol. Chem. 221: 879–884.
 Carter, H. E., C. P. Schaffner, and D. Gottlieb. 1954. Levomycin. I. Isolation and chemical studies. Arch. Biochem. Biophys. 53: 282–293.
 Carter, H. E., and F. L. Greenwood. 1952. Biochemistry of the sphingolipides. VII. Structure of the cerebrosides. J. Biol. Chem. 199: 283–288.
 Carter, H. E., D. Gottlieb, and H. W. Anderson. 1948. Chloromycetin and streptothricin. Science. 107: 113.

References

External links
 Herbert E. Carter Papers at the University of Illinois Archives
National Academy of Sciences Biographical Memoir

1910 births
2007 deaths
DePauw University alumni
University of Illinois Urbana-Champaign alumni
University of Illinois Urbana-Champaign faculty
Members of the United States National Academy of Sciences
University of Arizona faculty
American biochemists